Sinthusa mindanensis is a butterfly of the family Lycaenidae first described by Hisakazu Hayashi, Heinz G. Schröder and Colin G. Treadaway in 1978. It is found on the Philippine islands of Mindanao and Leyte.

References

, 1978: New species of Rapala and Sinthusa from Mindanao (Lepidoptera: Lycaenidae).: Tyô to Ga. 29 (4): 215–219. 
, 1995. Checklist of the butterflies of the Philippine Islands (Lepidoptera: Rhopalocera) Nachrichten des Entomologischen Vereins Apollo Suppl. 14: 7–118.

, 2012: Revised checklist of the butterflies of the Philippine Islands. Nachrichten des Entomologischen Vereins Apollo, Suppl. 20: 1-64.

Butterflies described in 1978
Sinthusa